Arne Brun Lie (February 2, 1925 – April 11, 2010) was a Norwegian-American author and Holocaust survivor, best known for the book Night and Fog: A Survivor's Story (1990).  

Born in Oslo, Norway, Lie was a member of the Norwegian Resistance during the Occupation of Norway by Nazi Germany. He was captured by the Gestapo in 1943  for resistance activity at sixteen years of age. He spent a year in Nazi concentration camps, including Natzweiler-Struthof and Dachau.  He was released in 1944.

Following his release, Lie moved back to Norway.  He immigrated to the United States in the early 1980s, and since then became public about his Holocaust experience, publishing a book and releasing a documentary film. Lie moved to Ipswich, MA in 1989. He was the brother of Sylvei Brun Lie, who is the wife of the famous Norwegian lawyer, judge and politician Jens Evensen. 

Arne Brun Lie died on 11 April 2010 in Beverly, MA.  He was 85 years old.

Selected works
Night and Fog (with Robby Robinson, W.W. Norton & Co. 1990) 
 Passage (The New Film Company, Inc.: 1991)
 From the Camps to the Kitchen (forthcoming book)

References

External links
U.S. Holocaust Research Institute Library
Night and Fog by Arne Brun Lie
Podcast Interview March 26, 2007

1925 births
2010 deaths
Norwegian resistance members
Dachau concentration camp survivors
Natzweiler-Struthof concentration camp survivors
Norwegian emigrants to the United States